This is a list of the National Register of Historic Places listings in Katmai National Park and Preserve.

This is intended to be a complete list of the properties and districts on the National Register of Historic Places in Katmai National Park and Preserve, Alaska, United States.  The locations of National Register properties and districts for which the latitude and longitude coordinates are included below, may be seen in a Google map.

There are 14 properties and districts listed on the National Register in the preserve, two of which are National Historic Landmarks.

Current listings 

|}

See also 
 National Register of Historic Places listings in Lake and Peninsula Borough, Alaska
 National Register of Historic Places listings in Dillingham Census Area, Alaska
 National Register of Historic Places listings in Bristol Bay Borough, Alaska
 List of National Historic Landmarks in Alaska

References

Katmai